Lord Love a Duck is a 1966 American teen black comedy film produced, directed and co-written by George Axelrod and starring Roddy McDowall and Tuesday Weld. The film was a satire of popular culture at the time, its targets ranging from progressive education to beach party films. It is based on Al Hine's 1961 novel of the same name.

Plot
From his prison cell, Alan Musgrave dictates his experiences of the previous year, which he dedicated to fulfilling the unending wishes and ambitions of high school senior Barbara Ann Greene. The daughter of Marie, a cocktail waitress sinking unhappily into her forties, Barbara Ann wants every kind of success and for everyone to love her.

Signing a pact with Alan in wet cement, Barbara Ann soon has the 12 cashmere sweaters needed to join an exclusive girls' club. She drops out of school to become the principal's new secretary and gets involved in church activities run by strait-laced but hyper-hormonal Bob Bernard. When Barbara Ann decides she wants Bob for her husband, Alan facilitates this by keeping Bob's eccentric mother Stella, who disapproves of Barbara Ann, perpetually drunk. Then Barbara meets producer T. Harrison Belmont, the King of Beach Party movies, and decides to become the biggest star that ever was. Bob refuses, however, to allow his wife to have a Hollywood screen test, so Barbara Ann decides she wants a divorce. Since Bob's mother frowns upon divorce, Alan takes matters into his own hands to kill Bob. Although Bob proves to be almost indestructible, by graduation time Alan has him in a wheelchair. At the graduation ceremony, Alan pursues Bob with a tractor, apparently killing him and several people on the speakers' platform. Barbara Ann goes on to Hollywood fame in her debut film Bikini Widow, while Alan is sent to prison.

Cast

Roddy McDowall as Alan "Mollymauk" Musgrave
Tuesday Weld as Barbara Ann Greene
Lola Albright as Marie Greene
Martin West as Bob Bernard
Ruth Gordon as Stella Bernard
Harvey Korman as Weldon Emmett
Sarah Marshall as Miss Schwartz
Lynn Carey as Sally Grace
Donald Murphy as Phil Neuhauser
Max Showalter as Howard Greene
Joseph Mell as Dr. Milton Lippman
Dan Frazer as Honest Joe
Martine Bartlett as Inez
Jo Collins as Kitten
David Draper as Billy Gibbons
Donald Foster as 	Mr. Beverly
Martin Gabel as T. Harrison "Harry" Belmont (uncredited)

Production
The film was based on a novel published in 1961. The New York Times called the book "hilarious at times and often charmingly wicked."

Film rights were bought in December 1964 by Gordon Carroll and George Axelrod under the banner of their company, Charleston Enterprises. Axelrod called the book "a cross between Andy Hardy and Dr Strangelove." Larry Johnson wrote the script along with Axelrod.

In May 1965 Roddy McDowall signed to play the lead. United Artists agreed to finance and Axelrod decided to direct. Axelrod had directed three plays on Broadway, Will Success Spoil Rock Hunter?, Once More With Feeling and Goodbye Charlie but this was his first film. Axelrod said he asked George S. Kaufman how to direct and Kaufman said "you get good actors. He was right. And if it's a comedy you don't get Actors Studio actors".

"I'm not really sure why I'm making this picture," said Axelrod. "Maybe I'm just trying to get revenge on my own teenagers. Lord Love a Duck will not be made specifically for the teenage market but teenagers will probably dig it. It puts everything down - society, vulgarity, adolescents. Teenagers like being put down."

Axelrod called the film "pop porn or Dirty Disney. It may yet give bad taste a bad name."

Shooting
Axelrod used as a music score the sound of teenagers with transistor radios.

He based his visual style on the films of Richard Lester such as A Hard Day's Night and The Knack. "Lester has shown us a freer form," said Axelrod. "I want to get away from the Hollywood syndrome of trying to make every shot look pretty and orderly."

The film was shot over 30 days for $850,000. "There's this gruesome prejudice in Hollywood that a picture made between $750,000 and $1 million cannot make a profit," said Axelrod. "I want to prove that this is nonsense. If I could do that and find new ways of saying things the film at least will serve the useful purpose of puncturing a hole in Hollywood's adolescent mystique."

Release
"We were worried about Lord Love a Duck," said Axelrod before the film came out. "We were afraid it might give bad taste a bad name. But I think we're alright. If the picture comes off well I may get an Oscar. If it comes off very well I may get deported."

The film was a financial failure. "I can't imagine why it wasn't a hit," said Axelrod. "It got no reaction. I couldn't get anybody into the theaters to see it. It was one of those pictures that died. United Artists sold the shit out of it. I went on the road with it. I got reams of press. I ran what I thought was a clever ad campaign, parodying all the other campaigns."

Awards
Lola Albright won the Silver Bear for Best Actress award at the 16th Berlin International Film Festival in 1966.

See also
 List of American films of 1966

References

Hine, Al. Lord Love a Duck (Atheneum, 1961)

External links 

 
 

1966 films
1960s black comedy films
1960s teen comedy films
American black-and-white films
American black comedy films
American high school films
American satirical films
American teen comedy films
Films based on American novels
Films directed by George Axelrod
Films scored by Neal Hefti
Films set in Los Angeles
United Artists films
Films with screenplays by George Axelrod
1966 directorial debut films
1966 comedy films
1966 drama films
1960s English-language films
1960s American films